Boom chick and variants such as "chicka" may refer to:

on and off beats (see back beat), as in Carter scratch
Boom Chicka Boom
bass and snare drum, as in beatboxing
Chick Chick Boom